Rune Almén (born 20 October 1952 in Trollhättan, Västra Götaland County) is a former Swedish track and field athlete who competed in the high jump.

Almén became Swedish junior champion in high jump three years in a row between 1970 and 1972. He went on to become the leading Swedish high jumper in the late 1970s, as he became Swedish outdoor champion six years in a row between 1973 and 1978. He also won the Swedish Indoor Championships four times.

During his career, Almén set two Swedish records. His outdoor personal best was 2.23 meters, which he achieved in Helsinki on 17 August 1974. His indoor personal best was 2.24 meters, a height which he cleared in Skoghall on 12 December 1976.

On 3 May 1980 in Karlstad Almén managed to clear 1.90 meters in the standing high jump. This result is still considered an unofficial world record for the unusual event.

National titles
Swedish Athletics Championships
High jump: 1973, 1974, 1975, 1976, 1977, 1978
Swedish Indoor Athletics Championships
High jump: 1974, 1975, 1978, 1980

International competitions

References

External links



Living people
1952 births
Swedish male high jumpers
People from Trollhättan
Athletes (track and field) at the 1976 Summer Olympics
Olympic athletes of Sweden
Sportspeople from Västra Götaland County